The following is a list of films created through Crazy8s held each year in Vancouver, BC.

Crazy8s 1999
 The Rememberer directed by Coreen Mayrs and produced by Christopher Gora
 untitled directed by Harry Killas and produced by Paul Scherzer
 8 Parts directed by Ryan Bonder

Crazy8s 2000
 Earliest Memory Exercise directed by Stacy Stewart Curtis
 Lift directed by Scott Weber
 My Life in 8 Minutes directed by Sandy Wilson
 Mr. Fortune’s Smile directed by Bruce Marchfelder 
 Power of Persuasion Fly directed by James Dunnison

Crazy8s 2001
 happyland directed by Veda Hille
 Briggs directed by Bill Switzer
 The Waiting Room directed by Penelope Buitenhaus and produced by Asaf Benny and Isabelle Longnus
 Tundra directed by Allan Harmon and produced by Jason Cameron
 Along for the Ride directed by Michael Love

Crazy8s 2002
 Mary’s Stigmata directed by Rae Dawn Chong
 The Good Life directed by Peter Chrzanowski
 Candy From Strangers directed by Eric Johnson and produced by Jason Cameron
 Swimming Upstream directed by Bonnie Benwick and produced by Jason Cameron
 REM directed by Carl Bessai

Crazy8s 2003
 50 Questions directed by Jacqueline Samuda and produced by Clare Hodge and Gerry Rutherford
 Danny and the Fairy G directed by Peter Stebbings
 Dogme Kung Fu! directed by Terry Mialkowsky and produced by Asha Gill and Ed Hatton
 21st Century Scott directed by Matt Sinclair and produced by Samantha Morris
 Do Not Disturb directed by Asaf Benny and produced by Isabelle Longnus

Crazy8s 2004
 Man. Feel. Pain. directed by Dylan Akio Smith and produced by Wendy Russell
 My Father is an Actor directed by Sara McIntyre and produced by Naomi Wright
 Flush directed by Alec MacNeill Richardson & Niall MacNeill Richardson and produced by Seán Cummings
 Chemistry directed by Cameron Labine and produced by Marc Stephenson
 Zapruder vs. Sasquatch directed by Ed Hatton

Crazy8s 2005
 24/7 directed by Kelly-Ruth Mercier and produced by Bonnie Jean Mah and Nancy Welsh
 All In directed by Guy Judge and produced by Daljit DJ Parmar
 Crazy Late directed by Zach Lipovsky and produced by Chris Ferguson
 Sandra Gets Dumped directed by Tracy D Smith and produced by Sophie McGarry and Chad Allan Smith
 ...nettirwnU directed by Kaare Andrews and produced by Mel Weisbaum

Crazy8s 2006
 Breakdown directed by John Bolton and produced by Errin Lally
 Sand Castle directed by Katrin Bowen and produced by Tihemme Gagnon
 Fool’s Gold directed by Jordan Christianson and produced by Lauren Grant
 John Day Afternoon directed by Luke Divers and produced by Shawn Divers
 Ashes to Ashes directed by Samm Barnes
 Remission Impossible directed by Ken Hegan and produced by Nancy Welsh	
 The Critic directed by Jaman Lloyd and produced by Chris Ferguson
 Circumference directed by CJ Wallis and produced by Michael David George and Marilyn Thomas

Crazy8s 2008
 Pi Day directed by Jon Anctil and produced by Scott Mainwood and Malcolm Oliver	
 After the Beep directed by Lewis Bennett and Mark Boucher and produced by Chris Eastwood
 Under Pressure: A Story of Microscopic Stakes directed by Daneil DeVita & Mike Dinsmore and produced by Graham Wardle
 Bethany directed by Zach Gayne & Alex Essoe
 Verna directed by Jeffrey Hornung
 Nobody Special directed by Robert Kirbyson and produced by Tracey Nomura
 Minimum Wage, The Night Shift directed by Jeremy Maeers
 Nobody Special directed by Laura Dione Rooke

Crazy8s 2009
 Cash AToM directed by Tyson Hepburn and produced by John Driftmier
 The Mechanic directed by Michael Grand and produced by James Brown	
 Mike Inc. directed by Jose Pablo Gonzalez and Paal Wilhelm Nesset and produced by Ryan Basaraba, Adrian Cox and Nilou Shahvarani
 Not Another Damn Musical directed by Chris Goldade and produced by Neil Dougall	
 Riboflavin! directed by Blair Dykes
 Teaser directed by Lidia Stante

Crazy8s 2010
 Cat vs. Man directed by Zia Marashi and produced by Cole Hewlett and Mark MacDonald
 The Education of Wendy Wisconsin directed by Dwight Hartnett and produced by Pat Sayer
 Sad Bear directed by Liz Cairns and Joe LoBianco and produced by Erica Landrock, Erik Paulsson and Marc Stephenson
 Tunnel directed by Arianna McGregor and produced by David Jevons
 Sikat directed by Angelina Cantada and produced by Ita Kane-Wilson and Olesia Shewchuk
 Stupid Chainsaw Tricks directed by Kellie Ann Benz and produced by Christopher Shyer

Crazy8s 2011
 Dead Friends directed by Stephen W. Martin and produced by Kate Clarke, Alexander Glua and Katelyn Mann
 Funny Business directed by Russell Bennett and produced by Kate Green and Siobhan McCarthy
 Chained directed by Rehan Khokhar and produced by Matt Granger and Mikey Granger
 Run Dry directed by Sarah Crauder and Lindsay George and produced by Jordan Hall and Mélanie Lê Phan
 Colouring on the Walls directed by Shaun McKinlay and produced by Athan Merrick and Julie Stangeland
 Alchemy and Other Imperfections directed by Zachary Rothman and produced by Heather Lindsay

Crazy8s 2012
 A Mother’s Love directed by Camille Mitchell and produced by Jonathan Tammuz
 A Red Girl’s Reasoning directed by Elle-Máijá Tailfeathers and produced by Rose Stiffarm
 These Walls directed by Doreen Manuel and produced by Tamara Bell and Kirstie Satchwell
 Sleepy Stories directed by Andrew Rowe and produced by Laura Hope and Michael Rowe
 The Vessel directed by Marshall Axani and produced by Diana Donaldson and Graham Wardle
 The Weather Girl directed by Carleen Kyle and produced by Nathalie de Los Santos

Crazy8s 2013
 Braindamage directed by Matt Leaf and produced by Victoria Angell
 In the Deep directed by Nimisha Mukerji and produced by Haydn Wazelle and Anand Raghavan
 Manstruation directed by Ryan Haneman and produced by Derek Green
 Stewing directed by Sean Tyson and produced by Patrick Currie
 Under the Bridge of Fear directed by Mackenzie Gray and produced by Ryan Catherwood and Simona Atias
 When I Saw You directed by Jane Hancock and produced by Nicholas Carella and Michelle Ouellet

Crazy8s 2014
 Bedbugs: A Musical Love Story directed by Matthew Kowalchuk and produced by Sean Tyson
 Body Language directed by Maéva Thibeault and produced by Jon Warne 
 Dial Y for Yesterday directed by Greg Crompton and produced by Darren Borrowman
 Earthlickers directed by Tony Mirza and produced by Justine Warrington, Alison Araya, Jim McKeown and Keli Moore
 Mattress directed by Michelle Kee and produced by David Kelso and Emma Peterson
 Sacrifice directed by Ryan Atimoyoo and produced by Peggy Thompson

Crazy8s 2015
 Kindergarten: Da Bin Ich Wieder directed by Aubrey Arnason and Kalyn Miles and produced by Laura Toplass
 One Last Ride directed by Caitlin Byrnes and produced by Jordan Barber, Caitlin Byrnes and Kyle Hollett  
 Outside the Lines directed by Scott Belyea and produced by Keli Moore and David Rice
 The Twisted Slipper directed by Angie Nolan and produced by Siobhan McCarthy and Katie Schaitel
 Under a Glass Moon directed by Mo Soliman and produced by Brent McCorkle
 The Wolf who Came to Dinner directed by Jem Garrard and produced by Michael Khazen

Crazy8s 2016
 A Family of Ghosts directed by Shannon Kohli and produced by Rob Meekison
 Grocery Store Action Movie directed by Matthew Campbell and produced by Ryan Silva, David Kaye and Jameson Parker
 I Love You So Much It's Killing Them directed by Joel Ashton McCarthy and produced by Nach Dudsdeemaytha, Keli Moore and Marena Dix
 Iteration 1 directed by Jesse Lupini and produced by Arshia Navabi and Mert Sari
 Meet Cute directed by Patrick Currie and produced by Michele Picard, Michelle Morris and Yogi Omar
 Trying directed by Shauna Johannesen and produced by Lulu Pan

Crazy8s 2017
 Anh Hung directed by Lelinh Du and produced by Frazer MacLean
 Cypher directed by Lawrence Le Lam and produced by Nach Dudsdeemaytha
 No Reservations directed by  Trevor Carroll and produced by Ben Mallin
 The Prince directed by Kyra Zagorsky and produced by Patrick Sabongui, Janene Carleton, Danielle Stott-Roy and Robin Nielson
 The Undertaker's Son directed by Heath Affolter, Jon Affolter and Thomas Affolter and produced by Rebeka Herron, Heath Affolter, Jon Affolter, Thomas Affolter and Nathan Affolter
 Woodman directed by Mike Jackson and produced by Rory Tucker, Rozlyn Young and Avi Glanzer

Crazy8s 2018
 Bordered directed by Anaïsa Visser and produced by Darren Devlin & Marco Bossow
 CC directed by Kailey Spear & Sam Spear and produced by Natasha Wehn
 Extra-Ordinary Amy directed by Christopher Graham and produced by Kris McRonney
 Gemini directed by Mily Mumford and produced by Phil Planta and Mayumi Yoshida
 Shuttlecock directed by Melanie Jones and produced by Kristyn Stilling
 Small Fish directed by Maxime Beauchamp and produced by Kent Donguines

Crazy8s 2019
 Ada directed by Steven Kammerer and produced by Amanda Konkin, Camille Hollett-French, Michael Khazen, Otto Mak and Kathleen Staples
 Hatch directed by Heather Perluzzo and produced by Robin Macabulos
 Idols Never Die directed by Jerome Yoo and produced by Mike Johnston, Thomas Affolter, Derek Kwan and Lawrence Le Lam
 Parabola directed by Lee Shorten and produced by Phil Planta and Brittany Lum-Cho
 The Mirror directed by Nessa Aref and produced by Madeleine Davis, Gabrielle Lambert and Sinead Hughes
 Unkept directed by Michael P. Vidler and produced by Pawan Deol

Crazy8s 2020
 Itsy Bitsy Spider directed by Brodi-Jo Scalise and produced by Josh Farnworth
 Mr. James Is Dead directed by Daniel Irving and Josh Aries and produced by Luisa Muniz and Mara Cruz
 Sol directed by Andy Alvarez and produced by Kate McCallum and Mike Johnston
 The Quieting directed by Ali Liebert and produced by Avi Glanzer, Nicolas Ayerbe Barona and Rebecca Steele
 The Substitute directed by Malibu Taetz and produced by David Mora Perea
 This Is a Period Piece directed by Bruna Arbex and produced by Karina Villela & Andrea Widjajanto

Crazy8s 2021
 Baba directed by Jay Kamal and produced by Javier Badillo and Panta Mosleh
 Crumbs directed by Jessey Nelson & Cody Nelson and produced by Joel Panas, Kyle Siemens, Rami Kahlon
 Cuello directed by Sebastian Ortiz Wilkins and produced by Moheb Jindran & Allen Xu
 iDorothy directed by Luvia Petersen and produced by Amanda Konkin
 Mom Vs Machine directed by Tesh Guttikonda and produced by Praneet Akilla, Bhavesh Chauhan, Kashif Pasta and Shyam Valera
 Tryst directed by Rachel Rose and produced by Mohamed Ibrahim, Eli Morris and Alisa Luke

Crazy8s 2022
 Consumer directed by Stephanie Izsak and produced by Kevin Keegan, Lori Watt, Nic Altobelli and Keara Barnes
 Imran and Alykhan directed by Shakil Jessa and produced by Sinéad Grewcock and Kora Vanderli
 The Faraway Place directed by Kenny Welsh and produced by Po-Chun Chen
 The Gold Teeth directed by Alireza Kazemipour and produced by Matisse Weyler-Hubert
 Undeveloped directed by Derek MacDonald and produced by Tyler Twiss
 Weeds Are Flowers, Too directed by Kay Shioma Metchie and produced by Vivian Davidson-Castro, Valerie Lopez and Alyssa Kostello

References

Film festivals in Vancouver